40S ribosomal protein S19 is a protein that in humans is encoded by the RPS19 gene.

Function 

Ribosomes, the organelles that catalyze protein synthesis, consist of a small 40S subunit and a large 60S subunit. Together these subunits are composed of 4 RNA species and approximately 80 structurally distinct proteins. This gene encodes a ribosomal protein that is a component of the 40S subunit. The protein belongs to the S19E family of ribosomal proteins. It is located in the cytoplasm. As is typical for genes encoding ribosomal proteins, there are multiple processed pseudogenes of this gene dispersed through the genome.

Clinical significance 

Mutations in this gene cause Diamond–Blackfan anemia (DBA), a constitutional erythroblastopenia characterized by absent or decreased erythroid precursors, in a subset of patients. This suggests a possible extra-ribosomal function for this gene in erythropoietic differentiation and proliferation, in addition to its ribosomal function. Higher expression levels of this gene in some primary colon carcinomas compared to matched normal colon tissues has been observed.

Interactions 

Ribosomal protein S19 has been shown to interact with basic fibroblast growth factor. RPS19 is also secreted extracellularly and its extracellular oligomers (crosslinked by the  transglutaminase Coagulation factor XIII) is also known to bind and probably inhibit Macrophage migration inhibitory factor; though S19 oligomers themselves share MCIP's function as another very strong macrophage chemoattractant and bind to anaphylotoxin C5 receptor

References

Further reading

External links 
  GeneReviews/NCBI/NIH/UW entry on Diamond–Blackfan Anemia
  OMIM entries on Diamond–Blackfan Anemia

Ribosomal proteins